Raoul Owens (born 22 August 1994) is a London-based, British racing driver. He will compete in the VLN Endurance Championship based at the Nürburgring with Walkenhorst Motorsport BMW.

Career

Early years
It was in the UK at the age of 8 that Raoul Owens began competing in karting. Shortly after, in 2005 with the family move to South Africa, Raoul continued his early development by joining the Western Province Motoring Club. By the following year Raoul had his first substantial milestone, winning the Mini Max Regional Championship.

In 2009 he moved up to the South African Northern Region where he was able to race alongside sterner competition at circuits that included Zwartkops Raceway and Vereeniging. The reward was to end the season as Vice Champion in the Junior Max Vice Championship, as well in the Rotax SARMC National Series – all in his inaugural year. As a result, Raoul was eligible to compete in the season's highlight event, the Rotax Grand Finals held in Egypt.
Simultaneously the same year, Raoul was to be seen competing in Europe, this time in the Rotax European Max Series. This proved a huge success, with Raoul being ranked 8th in a field of 50 other drivers.
2010 was also busy, with Raoul competing solely on the international stage in the Euro Max Challenge Series at leading circuits in Europe, as well as in the UK in the 'Super1' National Series.

Formula Renault BARC
2011 saw the biggest step up in class for Raoul as he advanced to Europe's highest rated open-wheel category at this level, Formula Renault BARC. Consequently, Raoul was to compete for 2 years at some of the most iconic UK tracks including Donington Park, Thruxton, Snetterton, Croft, Brands Hatch and Silverstone – showcasing to crowds of up to 40,000.
In the 2012 season he also competed in one-off competitions at Spa-Francorchamps, Magny-Cours and Le Mans. This year ended with an overall Top 10 finish.

Formula Renault Northern European Cup NEC

In 2013 Raoul embarked on a programme in mainland Europe with Mark Burdett Motorsport within the ranks of Formula Renault 2.0 Northern European Cup, racing in the hotly contested Northern European Cup (NEC) and increasing his exposure to the prestigious World Series by Renault (WSR) Formula Renault 2.0 category in 2014. 
To consolidate his skills in 2014, in addition to competing again in the Northern European Cup, Raoul competed in selected WSR events under wild cards. During this period Raoul worked with chief race engineer, Andy Miller – veteran of Formula One team Stewart GP.

Mazda Road To Indy

In 2015 Raoul relocated to Boston, USA to compete in the Mazda Road To Indy series in the Pro Mazda Championship. The Mazda Road To Indy (MRTI) series forms part of the support to the INDYCAR race calendar.
He initially joined JDC Motorsports for 6 races. 
Following this Raoul joined the Florida-based Pro Mazda Championship Team Pelfrey. The Pro Mazda category is part of the Road To Indy, which is the feeder series for IndyCar competition. His first race was in the 2015 Pro Mazda Winterfest series in advance of his debut in the Pro Mazda Championship.

Raoul's first foray in to the US was noteworthy for the number of in race accolades he won throughout the year, including the Quartermaster Hard Charger Award for most overtakes in a race at the Barber Motorsports Park.

RENAULT RS01 Trophy
2016 sees Raoul return to Europe to make the change and crossover in to GT Racing. He has joined the leading R-ace GP team competing in the 2016 Renault Sport Trophy in the new RS01 race car. The races are part of the World Series by Renault and support the European Le Mans Series.

Raoul ended the season with a creditable Top 10 position in this, the final year, of the 2016 Renault Sport Trophy.

2017 VLN Endurance Series,ADAC Qualifying Race 24HR Nürburgring and ADAC Zurich 24HR Race
Raoul competed in select rounds of the VLN Endurance Championship in 2017, along with the ADAC Qualifying Race 24h Nürburgring and the ADAC Zurich 24-Hour race. 
He scored a best finish of 4th in the VLN at the 9th round of the championship; finished 3rd at the ADAC Qualifying Race 24h Nürburgring.
Unfortunately, he failed to finish the ADAC Zurich 24-Hour race after running as high as 2nd place.

Statistics

Formula Renault 2.0 NEC 2013

Formula Renault 2.0 NEC 2014

Pro Mazda Championship

Renault Sport Trophy - Endurance Class 2016

Renault Sport Trophy - Pro Class 2016

Summary

References

External links
  Official Website
 YouTube Channel
 Driver Club Management (DCM)
 
 Mazda Road To Indy
 Pro Mazda Championship
 INDYCAR
 Mark Burdett Motorsport
 JDC Motorsport
 Team Pelfrey
 ART Junior Team

1994 births
Living people
English racing drivers
People from Pembury
Formula Renault 2.0 NEC drivers
Formula Renault Eurocup drivers
Formula Renault 2.0 Alps drivers
Indy Pro 2000 Championship drivers
Formula Renault BARC drivers
Team Pelfrey drivers
JDC Motorsports drivers
R-ace GP drivers
Mark Burdett Motorsport drivers
MP Motorsport drivers
Manor Motorsport drivers
Nürburgring 24 Hours drivers